Roughouse is a supervillain appearing in American comic books published by Marvel Comics. The character is depicted as the occasional enemy of Wolverine. His first appearance was in Wolverine vol. 2,  #4. The character was created by Chris Claremont and John Buscema.

Fictional character biography
Roughouse is one of the most mysterious opponents that Wolverine has come across. Little is known of his past beyond the fact that Roughouse is descended from one of the races that inhabit the dimension of Asgard, the mythical home of the Asgardian "gods." In Wolverine vol. 2,  #6, Roughouse provides the first clue to his origin by uttering the phrase, "Ymir's icy breath."  This is a reference to the giant Ymir, said to be the father of the race of beings known as the Frost Giants, the primary enemies of the Asgardian "gods." He is also known to have been systematically abused by his father as a boy. Some writers have suggested that the reason Roughouse wears long hair and a full beard is to hide scars received at the hands of his father.

In recent years, Roughouse has come to the island nation of Madripoor along with his partner, the "pseudo-vampire" Bloodscream. They have found employment under General Coy, one of the island's most powerful crime lords, as special enforcers used to eliminate any threats to his operations.  They are sent after the woman called Tyger Tiger, Coy's primary rival as the supreme crime boss of Madripoor.  This brings the two mercenaries into a number of conflicts with Wolverine. The duo are never able to defeat him.

General Coy grows tired of Roughouse's failures and literally sells him to Geist ("Ghost"), a former high ranking agent of Nazi Germany in the United Kingdom and a cyborg. By the time Roughouse meets him, Geist is financing himself through  illegal drug trade and needs a guinea pig on which to experiment a new drug. Geist's men give Roughouse a dose of this experimental version of cocaine which temporarily drives him mad.

Wolverine holds back in the fight with Roughouse, since Roughouse is not truly even aware of what he is doing.  After helping Roughouse escape, they come upon a mysterious nun of the Roman Catholic Church known only as Sister Salvation, who possesses the ability to cure those suffering from physical or mental injuries and cure sickness just by touching them with her hands.  After several "sessions" she is able to fully purge Roughouse's body of the cocaine induced suffering.  Roughhouse decides to stay with Sister Salvation in Tierra Verde to help her rebuild her destroyed mission.

It would be quite a while before Wolverine and Roughouse would cross paths again. In Wolverine #123, Roughhouse and Bloodscream had now renewed their partnership and ambushed Wolverine after the adamantium has been stripped from his skeleton. They manage to get the upper hand and beat Wolverine unconscious.  They bring him to their hideout where they beat him repeatedly over the next few days.  Wolverine is able to free himself from the shackles by breaking his own wrist, and engage the duo in combat, as Roughouse was on his way to shoot him in the head. It was believed that this would have killed Wolverine, and this is the last time he crosses paths with Roughouse.

It is unknown why Roughouse renews his partnership with Bloodscream, but as Bloodscream becomes increasingly cannibalistic it is unlikely Roughouse would have stayed with him. Roughouse, while a villain, still had some sense of honor and valued human life. Sure enough, the next time Wolverine encounters Bloodscream, Roughouse is no longer with him. He is instead replaced by the cannibalistic imbecile, Vermin.

Roughouse is hired by a violent criminal named Kimura to guard a group of children. A colleague tries to bribe Roughouse so as to gain perverted access to the kids, Roughouse instantly murders the man, verbally proclaiming that allow kids to come to harm is something he will not tolerate. Kimura later leads her forces on a direct attack against the de facto leader of Madripoor, Tiger Tyger. This includes intentionally murdering dozens of S.H.I.E.L.D. agents.

Powers and abilities
Roughouse possesses various superhuman physical attributes as a result of his unique heritage.

Roughouse cannot be slain by any metal forged by mortal man.

Roughouse is many times stronger than the average human. In Wolverine #123, Wolverine narrates that "He's  not Hulk-level strength." but is seen picking up a steamroller or forklift easily with one arm. This would put Roughhouse comparable to Colossus or Rogue. At that point Wolverine introduces into the story that Roughouse was descended from Rock Trolls.

Like full blooded Rock Trolls, the various tissues of Roughouse's body have much greater density than those of ordinary humans (contributing somewhat to Roughouse's great strength and size).  As a result, Roughouse's body is highly resistant to conventional injury.  Roughouse's body can withstand temperature extremes, puncture wounds, impact trauma, and high caliber machine gun shells without being injured. Even though Roughouse can be injured, the force or weaponry required to do so would have to be considerably more powerful than most conventional materials.

Roughouse's superhuman musculature produces far less lactic acid than the musculature of ordinary humans, granting him superhuman levels of stamina in all physical activities.

Special skills
Aside from his superhuman powers, Roughouse is a formidable hand-to-hand combatant. He utilizes mostly street fighting techniques that let him make full use of his great size and physical strength. He also has many connections throughout the criminal underworld, where he often hires himself out as a special enforcer.

In other media

Television
 Roughouse had a cameo in episode 16 of the X-Men series along with Bloodscream just like with the first ongoing Wolverine comic series.

See also
Roughhouse Rudy, nickname of Rudy LaRusso (1937–2004), American basketball player

References

Comics characters introduced in 1989
Marvel Comics characters with superhuman strength
Marvel Comics supervillains
Marvel Comics Asgardians
Characters created by Chris Claremont
Characters created by John Buscema
Fictional characters with superhuman durability or invulnerability
Wolverine (comics) characters